USS St. Louis (LCS-19) is a  littoral combat ship of the United States Navy. She is the seventh ship in naval service named after St. Louis, Missouri.

Design 
In 2002, the US Navy initiated a program to develop the first of a fleet of littoral combat ships. The Navy initially ordered two monohull ships from Lockheed Martin, which became known as the Freedom-class littoral combat ships after the first ship of the class, . Odd-numbered U.S. Navy littoral combat ships are built using the Freedom-class monohull design, while even-numbered ships are based on a competing design, the trimaran hull  from General Dynamics. The initial order of littoral combat ships involved a total of four ships, including two of the Freedom-class design.  St. Louis is the tenth Freedom-class littoral combat ship to be built.

Construction and career 
St. Louis was built in Marinette, Wisconsin by Marinette Marine. The ship was christened and launched on 15 December 2018. She was commissioned on 8 August 2020 and is assigned to Littoral Combat Ship Squadron Two.

References

 
 

Freedom-class littoral combat ships
Lockheed Martin
2018 ships